Richard Taylor "Dick" Schulze (born August 7, 1929) is an American businessman and politician who served as a member of the U.S. House of Representatives from 1975 to 1993. His district encompassed portions of Montgomery, Delaware, and Chester Counties in the western Philadelphia suburbs.

Early life and career
Schulze was born in Philadelphia, Pennsylvania. He graduated from Haverford High School in 1948, and attended the University of Houston in 1949, Villanova University in 1952, and Temple University in 1968. He served in the United States Army from 1951 to 1953 and worked in the appliance business in Paoli, Pennsylvania. Schulze entered politics serving as Register of Wills of Chester County from 1967 to 1969, before he was elected to the Pennsylvania House of Representatives, where he served two terms.

Congressional career
During his career in the House, Schulze rose to serve as a-top ranking member on the House Ways and Means Committee and the senior Republican member on the Oversight Subcommittee. He also served on the Armed Services Committee and Banking. He chaired the Republican Study Committee, and was the Republican Whip for Pennsylvania. Ronald Reagan appointed Schulze to the Presidential Advisory Committee on Federalism.  Schulze was one of the "Reagan 13".

Schulze also served on the Natural Resources Committee and is a former member of the Migratory Bird Commission. George H. W. Bush appointed Schulze to serve on the Board of the National Fish and Wildlife Foundation. He also founded the Congressional Sportsmen's Caucus and Foundation in 1990. Schulze served as Chairman of the National Prayer Breakfast, and has been a member of the House of Representatives weekly prayer breakfast for over 30 years.

Post-congressional career
Schulze was the Senior Legislative Consultant to Valis Associates, a Republican firm, on issues involving energy, transportation, free trade, business taxes, environmental regulation of business, and gun rights.

Personal life
Schulze was married to Anne "Nancy" Lockwood, with whom he had four children, until her death from breast cancer in 1990. He later married Nancy Waltermire (née Senechal), widow of former Montana Secretary of State Jim Waltermire.

References

External links
Stennis Center for Public Service .
The Political Graveyard

1929 births
Living people
County officials in Pennsylvania
Republican Party members of the Pennsylvania House of Representatives
Military personnel from Philadelphia
People from Paoli, Pennsylvania
Politicians from Philadelphia
Republican Party members of the United States House of Representatives from Pennsylvania
Temple University alumni
Villanova University alumni
United States Army personnel
University of Houston alumni
Members of Congress who became lobbyists